Our Lady of Caysasay is a Roman Catholic image of the Blessed Virgin Mary venerated at the Archdiocesan Shrine of Our Lady of Caysasay in Taal, Batangas, Philippines. The image depicts the Immaculate Conception is believed to be one of the oldest in the country, originally discovered in 1603 by a native man fishing in the Pansipit River. The subsequent Marian apparitions documented by Spanish colonial church leaders were the first in the country; devotees today continue to attribute miracles to the Virgin.

Pope Pius XII granted a pontifical decree of coronation on 21 November 1954 to the Archbishop of Lipa, Alejandro Olalia y Ayson. The decree was signed by the Secretary Deacon of the Vatican Chapter, Giulio Rossi and notarized by the Guardian Chancellor of the Vatican Chapter, Monsignor Ferdinand Prosperini Joseph Calderari. The coronation was carried out by the Archbishop of Santiago de Compostela, Cardinal Fernando Quiroga Palacios on 8 December 1954. 

The image remains at its unrestored, original complexion.  It was later given the title the "Queen of the Archdiocese of Lipa". The feast day of the image  is celebrated every December 8—9.

Description
The wooden image measures , shows the Virgin as tilting slightly forward, her hands clasped across her breasts below her right shoulder. One eye is slightly bigger than the other. It was found wearing a simple, red tunic gathered above its waist that billowed into huge folds around the ankles, and clad in a green shawl.

The report and documentation of the apparitions of 1611—1619 and 1639, are unique in Philippine church annals as they are believed to be the first Marian apparitions in the Philippines. In those days, the country was under the autonomous Mexican vicariate; Father Casimiro Díaz, who reported the confirmation of the apparitions and miracles, was a deputy of the order's Mexican center.

History

Discovery 

In the year 1603 in Caysasay, which was a small barangay of Taal, a fisherman called Juan Maningcad went out fishing. Instead of casting his net to the sea, he threw it into the nearby Pansipit River. When he drew in his net, he caught a small, wooden image of the Blessed Virgin Mary less than a foot high. Though waterlogged, the image had a heavenly lustre, causing the pious Maningcad to prostrate himself and pray before the statue, which he brought home.

The precise origin of the image and how it got to the river is unknown. One theory was that the image was cast into the sea off Batangas by the Spanish to pacify it during an expedition, and that it was somehow pushed upriver. Other opinions held that perhaps someone exploring the river had inadvertently dropped it, or that it came from China. News of the image began to spread until it reached the parish priest, Fray Juan Bautista Montoya, and the vicar that represented the reigning King of Spain. They went to Maningcad's house to verify the story, and upon seeing the image, knelt down and venerated it.

Disappearances 
Doña María Espíritu, the widow of the town's judge, was assigned as the image's camarera or caretaker. She ordered a precious urna (a wooden, canopied shrine that sometimes has glass panes) to be made for the image and kept it in her home. Every evening, she noticed that the image went missing from its urna, but then in the morning it would be back in its usual place. Worried, the widow told the story to the priest, who accompanied her back to her house and saw that the urna was empty. The urna suddenly opened and the image appeared before them. The priest decided to gather volunteers to keep vigil beside the image, and during the night they did see the urna open by itself, and the image leaving and coming back again.

Finally, the priest decided that the villagers should now come with lighted candles and follow the image the next time it left. When this happened, the image led them to Caysasay, to the place where it was originally found. The priest decided to take the image to the Basilica of Saint Martin de Tours for safekeeping, but the image continued to leave the church until one day it disappeared and was nowhere to be found.

Years later, two girls named María Bagohin and María Talain were gathering firewood, and saw the image reflected in the waters of a spring near where Juan Maningcad had found it. They looked up, and saw the image of the Lady of Caysasay on top of a tall sampaguita (Jasminum sambac) bush, flanked by two lit candles and guarded by several casay-casay (Collared kingfisher, Todiramphus chloris) that abounded in the hillside area, thus called Caysasay by the Spaniards. The two reported what they saw to the parish priest, who with the people concluded that it was the Virgin's wish to stay in Caysasay. A makeshift chapel was built on the very spot where the image was found, and native devotion to the Our Lady of Caysasay had started even without official church sanction. Fr. Pedro Murillo Velarde SJ in his Historia de Filipinas and other 18th century Spanish chroniclers put the year 1611 as when natives began reporting strange visions on the hillside. This was also the year, according to Fr. Pedro G. Galende, Director of the San Agustín Museum in Intramuros, that the first makeshift church was reportedly built there.

Apparition to Catalina Talain
A series of apparitions by the Blessed Virgin Mary were first reported at the rocky hillside of Caysasay. According to a church inquiry, a vision appeared to a native servant girl, Catalina Talain, who had gone up the hillside with a companion to gather firewood and fetch some water. The unexpected vision of something small in stature but radiating extraordinary brilliance from a hollow in the rocky landscape so bewildered the girl that she ran to tell her companion, and both fled terrified back to the town of Taal, by the shore of the lake. From the cave near the spring was found the image of the Blessed Virgin—the same image that was fished out of the river almost a decade earlier and mysteriously disappeared.

Historian José M. Cruz, S.J. reviewed original microfilm documents of the inquiry into the apparitions, which he dated to 1619. He reported that Church officials interrogated Talain, but she told them she could not clearly identify what she saw. The sparseness of her report, however, convinced Cruz that Talain was not fabricating the story; he noted in his study on the events that in 17th-century Philippines, a servant girl like Talain had much to gain from associating herself with God or the saints.

Apparition to Juana Tangui
The apparition of the Lady of Caysasay to Juana Tangui was a more documented report. Fr. Casimiro Díaz, a representative of the Mexican vicar, in his 18th century Conquista de las Islas Filipinas (Part II), gave a detailed account:

After this unusual phenomenon had been witnessed, which had never before been seen or heard of in that sitio, some natives, both men and women, decided to see what it really was. They saw a vision of the Virgin Mary, just a little taller than the size of one open hand from the tip of the thumb to the tip of the middle finger, dressed in white, with a crown on her head, and in her arms was the Infant Jesus, who also wore a crown.  Miraculous healing powers were attributed to the waters from the spring. More than 30 people declared they saw visions of the Lady at Caysasay.  Word got around and many people flocked to the area.

The news reached a native named Juana Tangui, from the town of Bauan who was the servant of Don Juan Mangabot, one of the town's prominent natives. She was a simple woman who led a devout life who had been suffering for a long time from a burning sensation in the eyes leaving her almost blind.  Her eyes could not be healed by the many remedies that had been applied to it. She was resolved to go to the rock where people said that the Blessed Virgin appeared. She went accompanied by one of her master's daughters to that place where the ray of light was first seen. She had also heard that everyone who took a bath in the small stream was cured of any sickness of which they may have been suffering.  For this reason she bathed in the stream, in the company of nine or ten other people doing the same. During the entire time of her bath, she noticed an unusual shadow by her side, though there was neither sun nor moon that could cause it, since it was already evening, and it was very dark.

After some time she felt that someone was holding her and turning her body. When she turned to the place toward which she was being turned, she saw a great light, like that coming from an enormous lighted candle, which caused her great wonder. But she did not dare to move forward in order to examine what she had seen. She went to a nearby field where she recounted what had happened to some native women. But they told her to return and to examine closely what it was. Since she said that she could not see very well, on account of her eye disease, they offered a young servant to accompany her to that place. (The recent account of Fr. Cruz is similar but says it was a young servant boy that was sent back with Juana.) Upon their arrival at the spot, she made the girl kneel down. Juana walked further and saw a very bright light and the image of our Lady, almost two palm measurements in height, dressed in white, with a crown on her head and a cross on her forehead. The image seemed to be alive, as it was moving and blinking. When the native woman moved closer to her, the image spoke to her, thanking her for remembering her and coming back to see her. Juana declared that the apparition told her,

The native woman returned to the town, and did not tell anyone about what had happened until she had spoken with Fr. Juan Bautista Montoya, the prior of the Taal Convent. She asked him reverentially for the belt of the Confraternity. After spending eight days in confession, the prior gave the customary belt to her.

She returned to the place where the Blessed Virgin had spoken to her. In addition to herself, she brought with her eight or nine people, among them the wife of her master, Doña Juliana Dimoyaguín and other prominent residents, whose declarations appear in the accounts published about the event. They returned to the same place where the girl who had accompanied her the first time had knelt down. She moved forward to the same spot where she had been a few days before, and she saw once more, clearly and distinctly, the Blessed Virgin. After making a deep bow, Juana knelt in her presence.

The Virgin told her that she was much more pleased with her than before, because she was wearing the belt of the Confraternity. The devout native asked the Virgin directly what sign she should carry so that people would believe that she had spoken to and been in the company of the Virgin. The Virgin responded by asking for Juana's rosary and belt, telling her that it was a sufficient sign for her to touch them. Juana gave the Queen of Heaven her belt and her rosary, together with the rosaries that her companions had taken care to bring with them.

The Virgin accepted them and then returned them to the said Juana Tangui. The women who received the rosaries declared that the fragrance that emanated from them elevated their souls. Moreover, Juana's eyes were healed, her eyesight restored.

Deliverance of the town
By 1732, the town of Taal became the prosperous capital of the Batangas province. The town center of Taal was then located along the shore of Taal Lake (then known as Lake Bombon). Its prosperity came from provisioning the Manila galleons plying between Acapulco and Manila. These galleons also found protection from typhoons at Taal Lake, which was then saline and open to the sea through the navigable Pansipit River. They honoured the Lady of Caysasay with cannon fire as they passed in front of her shrine located close to the river.

The most violent eruption of the Taal Volcano occurred in 1754 lasting more than eight months. The ejecta from the volcano devastated the towns around the lake covering them with layers of deposits. The townspeople of Taal, together with their parish priest, fled from their capital and sought refuge at the Church of Our Lady of Caysasay. Layers of ejecta and deposits blocked the entrance of Pansipit River, which eventually raised the water of the lake, permanently flooding parts of Tanauan, Lipa, Sala, Bauan and Taal. All five towns relocated to higher ground, away from the volcano and lake.  The present town center of Taal was established on a hillside near the Caysasay Shrine, overlooking Balayan Bay. The townspeople believed that the image saved the town of Taal during eruptions of Taal Volcano.

The old town center is now the present San Nicolas, Batangas. Eventually, a considerably narrower and shallower Pansipit River was formed from the volcanic deposits rendering it impassable for large ships. Bombon Lake, later renamed as Taal Lake, slowly transformed from saline to a freshwater lake.

Pontifical coronation
Pope Pius XII issued a Pontifical decree of coronation on 21 November 1954 to the Archbishop of Lipa, Alejandro Olalia y Ayson. The papal bull was signed by the Secretary Deacon of the Vatican Chapter, Giulio Carlo Rossi and notarized by the Guardian Chancellor of the Vatican Chapter, Monsignor Ferdinand Prosperini Joseph Calderari. 

On 8 December 1954, the rite of coronation was executed by the Archbishop of Santiago de Compostela, Cardinal Fernando Quiroga Palacios.

Well of Saint Lucy

This old spring-fed well where María Bagohin and María Talain saw the reflection of the Virgin of Caysasay is known as the Balón ng Sta. Lucía (Well of Saint Lucy), which was where the public devotion to the Virgin of Caysasay was initially centred. A beautifully carved coral stone arch with a bas relief of the Virgin on the facade was constructed over the spring on the slope of a hill near the church, forming twin wells. The exact reason for St Lucy's name being attached to the spring has been lost, as was the date of its construction. The site of the wells is known as "Banál na Poók" ("sacred place"), and vestiges of the spring running close to the wells are known as "Banal na Tubig" (sacred water).

The well is accessed from the Saint Lorenzo Ruiz Steps behind the Caysasay Church. An inconspicuous narrow walkway from the Steps takes visitors to the well.

To the townsfolk, the apparition had empowered the spring with healing powers. Continues Fr. Díaz:

Religious syncretism
The image  is sometimes identified by some Chinese Filipinos with the Taoist goddess Mazu or the Buddhist goddess Quan Yin due to its alleged origin and former veneration in Taiwan, China. 

Both deities are considered archetype emanations of each other, with the comparative Catholic images of Our Lady of Antipolo and Our Lady of the Abandoned as additional emanations, as all four are related to water and/or travel.

In popular media
In 2005, a musical play titled Mapághimaláng Birhen ng Caysasay (Miraculous Virgin of Caysasay) was staged in July 2005 at the Cultural Center of the Philippines in Manila.  The religious play was written and directed by Nestor U. Torre with music by noted Filipino composer Ryan Cayabyab.  It focuses on the 1639 miracle on Chinese artisan named Hay Bing who was brought to life after he was decapitated. After its initial run, a touring production took the musical to the outskirts of the capital city including Batangas province.

See also
Our Lady of Camarin, a Guamanian statue also found by a fisherman
Our Lady of Salambao, also found in a net and a focus of the Obando Fertility Rites

References

Taal, p. 95, Filipiniana Section, Teodoro M. Kalaw Memorial Library, Lipa City, Batangas
  Barcelona, Mary Anne (2004). Ynang Maria: A Celebration of the Blessed Virgin Mary in the Philippines. Edited by Consuelo B. Estepa, Ph.D. Anvil Publishing, Inc, Pasig.

External links

 Mapaghimalang Birhen ng Caysasay, the musical play about the Lady of Caysasay
 Caysasay Fluvial Procession 1
 Caysasay Fluvial Procession 2
 Luwa sa Birhen ng Caysasay

Catholic Church in the Philippines
Religion in Batangas
Taal, Batangas
Titles of Mary
Marian apparitions
Statues of the Virgin Mary
Marian devotions